James Ralph Wooley (born March 8, 1949) is an American judoka and two time Olympian. He was born in Houston, Texas.

Wooley was a student of Karl Geis.  He utilized ballet as a method of increasing his flexibility and improving his technique. Wooley was on the 1972 Olympic Team in Judo where he competed in the under 93 kg division.  He was also on the 1976 Olympic Team competing in the open division. Wooley went on to become a doctor and a judo coach.

References

1949 births
Living people
Olympic judoka of the United States
Judoka at the 1972 Summer Olympics
Judoka at the 1976 Summer Olympics
American male judoka
Pan American Games medalists in judo
Pan American Games bronze medalists for the United States
Judoka at the 1975 Pan American Games
Medalists at the 1975 Pan American Games
20th-century American people
21st-century American people